The term model year in computer modeling is used for calculated equations describing one calendar year of data. If a climate model, for example, is calculating the climate from 2015 to 2020, the computer has to calculate 5 model years, however it most likely takes much less time for the computer to do so.

Numerical climate and weather models
Simulation software